The bluntface shiner (Cyprinella camura) is a species of fish in the carp family, Cyprinidae. It is native to the United States, where it occurs in two disjunct populations on either side of the Mississippi River. It is a common fish in its range, even abundant in some localities.

The fish reaches a maximum length of about 15 centimeters. It lives in creeks, rivers, and pools.

References

Cyprinella
Fish of the United States
Taxa named by David Starr Jordan 
Taxa named by Seth Eugene Meek
Fish described in 1884